The Cerro Carnerero Formation is a geological formation of the Golfo San Jorge Basin in Chubut Province, Patagonia, Argentina.

Description 

The formation dates back to the Middle Jurassic (Toarcian stage) and has preserved fossils of Cladophlebis oblonga, and Amygdalodon patagonicus.

The fossiliferous beds rest on Liassic beds with Harpoceras subplanatum, and below the Middle to Upper Jurassic Porphyritic Series. Called the "Cerro Carnerero" beds, Rauhut, 2008, assigned the Cerro Carnerero to the Toarcian to Bajocian.

Lithology 
The formation comprises sandy tuffs and bluish gray claystones, which form part of a continental sedimentary series mixed with porphyritic conglomerates with partly encrusted round pebbles, and bluish gray clays with sandy intercalations and clays in lesser amounts.

Fossil content

Vertebrate fauna

Arthropods 
 Estheria sp.

See also 
 List of dinosaur-bearing rock formations
 Cañadón Asfalto Formation
 Posidonia Shale

References

Bibliography

Further reading 
 

Geologic formations of Argentina
Jurassic System of South America
Jurassic Argentina
Bajocian Stage
Toarcian Stage
Shale formations
Tuff formations
Fluvial deposits
Formations
Fossiliferous stratigraphic units of South America
Paleontology in Argentina
Geology of Chubut Province